Hemimacronyx is a proposed genus of birds in the pipit and wagtail family Motacillidae. It contains two species that are usually treated as belonging to two larger genera, Macronyx (in the case of Sharpe's longclaw) and Anthus (in the case of yellow-breasted pipit). The plumage of the two species is more similar to that of the longclaws and the golden pipit, having brown barred backs and bright yellow breasts and throats. They are presumed to be closely related to these two groups, but the split has not been widely recognised. Both species are found in open areas of Africa. They are both threatened with extinction due to human activities, principally habitat loss.

 Sharpe's longclaw (Hemimacronyx sharpei)
 Yellow-breasted pipit (Hemimacronyx chloris)

References

Motacillidae
Bird genera